Bernard Sylvain Mvondo-Etoga (4 May 1983 – 24 December 2020) was a Cameroonian judoka. He competed in the 2004 Summer Olympics. He won a bronze medal at the 2001 Jeux de la Francophonie.

He died on 24 December 2020, in a French prison under mysterious circumstances after being in custody for a week.

Achievements

References

External links

1983 births
2020 deaths
Cameroonian male judoka
Judoka at the 2004 Summer Olympics
Olympic judoka of Cameroon
Deaths in police custody in France
20th-century Cameroonian people
21st-century Cameroonian people